The 2017–18 LIU Brooklyn Blackbirds men's basketball team represented The Brooklyn Campus of Long Island University during the 2017–18 NCAA Division I men's basketball season. The Blackbirds, led by first-year head coach Derek Kellogg, played their home games at the Steinberg Wellness Center, with several home games at the Barclays Center, as members of the Northeast Conference. They finished the season 18–17, 10–8 in NEC play to finish in a tie for fourth place. As the No. 4 seed in the NEC tournament, they defeated St. Francis Brooklyn, Fairleigh Dickinson, and Wagner to become NEC Tournament champions. They earned the NEC's automatic bid to the NCAA tournament where they lost in the First Four to Radford.

Previous season 
The Blackbirds finished the 2016–17 season at 20–12, 13–5 in nec play to finish in second place. In the NEC tournament, they lost to  Robert Morris in the quarterfinals.

On March 20, 2017, head coach Jack Perri was fired after five seasons at LIU Brooklyn. Former Massachusetts head coach Derek Kellogg was hired as the new head coach on April 18.

Preseason 
In a poll of league coaches at the NEC media day, the Blackbirds were picked to finish in sixth place.

Roster

  

   
 
        

Source

Schedule and results

|-
!colspan=9 style=| Non-conference regular season

|-
!colspan=9 style=| Northeast Conference regular season    

   
|-
!colspan=9 style=| NEC tournament

|-
!colspan=9 style=| NCAA tournament

References

LIU Brooklyn Blackbirds men's basketball seasons
LIU Brooklyn
LIU Brooklyn
LIU Brooklyn
LIU Brooklyn